KPRZ (1210 kHz "K-Praise 106.1 and 1210") is a commercial AM radio station licensed to San Marcos-Poway, California and serving the San Diego metropolitan area. It is owned by the Salem Media Group and broadcasts a Christian talk and teaching radio format.  National religious leaders heard on KPRZ include David Jeremiah, Jim Daly, Chuck Swindoll and Charles Stanley.  Secular conservative talk hosts include Eric Metaxas, Charlie Kirk and Jay Sekulow.  The studios and offices are on Towne Centre Drive in San Diego.

By day, KPRZ is powered at 20,000 watts.  But 1210 AM is a clear channel frequency, so to reduce interference at night to other stations, KPRZ cuts its power to 10,000 watts.  KPRZ has a directional signal using a three-tower array.  The transmitter site is on Canyon de Oro Drive near the San Elijo Hills.  Programming is also heard on a 250 watt FM translator, K291CR at 106.1 MHz, in Encinitas.

History
This station received a construction permit on May 8, 1984. On September 12, the station was assigned the call sign KNEF, only to change to the current KPRZ call letters on December 18. KPRZ signed on in the summer of 1986 with a Christian radio format.

In late 2005, the station was put up for sale. On December 16 that year, it was announced that the Salem Media Group (through licensee New Inspiration), would acquire the station. It was approved on December 22, and the sale was consummated on February 23, 2006.

In August 2018, KPRZ received a translator, using the call sign K291CR. K291CR rebroadcasts KPRZ's programming to the North County area on 106.1 FM at 250 watts, the maximum power rating allowed for a translator.

References

External links
1210 KPRZ official website

PRZ
News and talk radio stations in the United States
PRZ
Radio stations established in 1984
San Marcos, California
Salem Media Group properties